The 1969 Western Illinois Leathernecks football team represented Western Illinois University as a member of the Interstate Intercollegiate Athletic Conference (IIAC) during the 1969 NCAA College Division football season. They were led by first-year head coach Darrell Mudra and played their home games at Hanson Field. The Leathernecks finished the season with a 8–2 record and a 3–0 record in conference play, winning the IIAC title.

Schedule

References

Western Illinois
Western Illinois Leathernecks football seasons
Interstate Intercollegiate Athletic Conference football champion seasons
Western Illinois Leathernecks football